The 2006 Strauss Canada Cup of Curling was held January 31-February 5, 2006 at the Interior Savings Centre in Kamloops, British Columbia. The Kevin Martin rink won their second men's title and Cathy King won her first title on the women's side.

Men's event

Teams

Preliminary round

Playoffs

Women's event

Teams

Preliminary round

Tie breaker
Jones 7, Scott 5

Playoffs

External links
Archived Official Website
Women's final on YouTube
Men's final on YouTube

2006 in British Columbia
Canada Cup (curling)
Sport in Kamloops
2006 in Canadian curling
Curling competitions in British Columbia
January 2006 sports events in Canada
February 2006 sports events in Canada